Washford railway station is a station on the  West Somerset Railway, a heritage railway in England. The station is situated in the village of Washford, which is itself within the civil parish of Old Cleeve in the county of Somerset.

History

The station was opened on 16 July 1874 by the Minehead Railway. The railway was operated by the Bristol and Exeter Railway which was amalgamated into the Great Western Railway in 1876. The Minehead Railway was itself absorbed into the GWR in 1897 which, in turn, was nationalised into British Railways in 1948.

The signal box was closed in 1952, goods traffic ceased in 1964, and the station was unstaffed from 1966.  The line was eventually closed on 4 January 1971, but was reopened by the West Somerset Railway on 28 August 1976.

Description
Washford is the second highest station on the line and is situated in a gap between the coastal cliffs and the Brendon Hills. It is accessed by two very steep inclines for steam trains – climbing up from  trains face a  section at 1 in 65 (1.5%), the steepest on the line. The station has a single platform on the south side of the line, although there is an extensive yard on the opposite side of the line from the platform which is where the Somerset and Dorset Railway Trust is housed.

Somerset and Dorset Railway Trust Museum

The Somerset and Dorset Railway Trust has been based at Washford from 1976, however they and the WSR are in negotiations about the future use of the former goods yard. The Trust's collection contains relics of the Somerset and Dorset Joint Railway (S&DJR), including station nameboards, lamps, tools, signalling equipment, tickets, photographs, handbills, rolling stock and steam locomotives. The Trust's Peckett and Sons 0-4-0ST No. 1788 "Kilmersdon" was based there for many years when not on hire but has now moved to the Mid-Hants Railway (Watercress Line).

Next to the original stone station building of 1874 is a much smaller wooden building, which originally was the Great Western Railway's signal box. Most of the stock and artefacts have now been moved to new locations - the main new location is Alresford, on the Mid-Hants Railway (Watercress Line), where a new secondary main lines museum has been established.

Services

References

External links

 West Somerset Railway's website – Washford Station
 Washford Station
 Somerset and Dorset Railway Trust

West Somerset Railway
Heritage railway stations in Somerset
Railway stations in Great Britain opened in 1874
Railway stations in Great Britain closed in 1971
Railway stations in Great Britain opened in 1976
Former Great Western Railway stations
Museums in Somerset
Railway museums in England